The Wingham Chronicle, previously published as The Wingham Chronicle and Manning River Observer, is a daily newspaper originally published in Wingham, New South Wales, Australia, now in Pyrmont, New South Wales by Fairfax Media.

Newspaper history 
The newspaper was founded in 1880 by Edward Rye Junior. It was originally issued weekly and became bi-weekly in February 1886. The title of the paper changed several times until May 1897 when it became The Wingham Chronicle and Manning River Observer, the title it retained until its initial closure in 1983. The newspaper's longest standing editor and proprietor was Frederick Arthur Fitzpatrick between the years 1916 and 1953.  When Fitzpatrick retired he passed on the editorship to his son J.J. (Jack) Fitzpatrick who controlled the paper until approximately 1975. The newspaper closed in 1983, but was reopened by Consolidated Press on 1 October 1987 under the editorship of Lesley Joy Penfold, when it changed its title to The Wingham Chronicle .

Digitisation 
The paper is planned to be digitised as part of the Australian Newspapers Digitisation Program  of the National Library of Australia.

See also 
 List of newspapers in Australia
 List of newspapers in New South Wales

External links

References

Newspapers published in New South Wales
Daily newspapers published in Australia
Newspapers on Trove